Mount Girouard is the highest peak of the Fairholme Range in Banff National Park, Alberta, Canada. Mt. Girouard is located in the Bow River valley south of Lake Minnewanka.

The mountain was named in 1904 after Sir Édouard Girouard, a railway builder in Africa during the rule of the British Empire.


Geology
Mount Girouard is composed of sedimentary rock laid down during the Precambrian to Jurassic periods. Formed in shallow seas, this sedimentary rock was pushed east and over the top of younger rock during the Laramide orogeny.

Climate
Based on the Köppen climate classification, Mount Girouard is located in a subarctic climate with cold, snowy winters, and mild summers. Precipitation runoff from the mountain drains into the Bow River.

See also
 Geology of Alberta

References

External links
 Mount Girouard weather: Mountain Forecast

Two-thousanders of Alberta
Mountains of Banff National Park